El Viejo Post Office is a historic post office in downtown Modesto. Built in 1933, the post office houses murals depicting pastoral scenes. The building's roof is made entirely of terra cotta tiles.         
The building remained a U.S. Post Office until 2011 when it was closed and the Federal Government auctioned off the building. It was purchased by an investment group and remodeled, however the original murals that were intact at the end of the Postal service era remain intact. Some of the original murals were removed and lost after a remodeling of the post office in 1960, however two were found recently. The Federal government took the lost murals into custody prior to them being re-hung in their original place. The building currently houses a law office, although the murals and some of the original brass post office boxes remain on display.

See also 
List of United States post offices

References

External links

Buildings and structures in Modesto, California
Post office buildings on the National Register of Historic Places in California
Buildings and structures in Stanislaus County, California
National Register of Historic Places in Stanislaus County, California